Steven Allerick is a Canadian-American actor. He is best known for his roles as Snake Eyes's father in Snake Eyes: G.I. Joe Origins and as Simba in the Broadway production of Disney's The Lion King.

Life and career 
Allerick was born in Toronto, Ontario, to Jamaican parents. He graduated from Ryerson University. His work can be seen in numerous television shows including The Expanse and Fear the Walking Dead, and his voice can be heard on the title track to the hit anime Beyblade Burst as well as his self-titled album.

Filmography

Film

Television

Selected theatre

Dicsography
 Our Time - Beyblade Burst Theme Song

References

External links
 
 

Living people
American male film actors
American male television actors
21st-century American male actors
Year of birth missing (living people)